Ekumfi is one of the constituency represented in the parliament of Ghana. It elects one Member of Parliament (MP) by the first past the poll system of election. Ekumfi is located in the Ekumfi district of the Central region of Ghana. It was formerly part of the Mfantseman East Constituency.

Member of Parliament

See also 
 List of Ghana Parliament constituencies

References 

Parliamentary constituencies in the Central Region (Ghana)